Hudson is a newer residential neighbourhood in north west Edmonton, Alberta, Canada. Before development, the site was home of Edmonton International Speedway, a drive-in theatre, and a driving range.

Almost four out of five (78%) of residences in the neighbourhood are single-family dwellings.  All but one of the remainder are duplexes.  Almost all residences are owner-occupied.

Demographics 

Surrounding neighbourhoods 
The neighbourhood is bounded on three sides by the neighbourhood of Pembina and on one side by the neighbourhood of Cumberland.  A short distance to the east is the Castledowns neighbourhood of Baranow.  A short distance to the south is the neighbourhood of Wellington.

References

External links 
 Hudson Neighbourhood Profile

Neighbourhoods in Edmonton